The Driggers D1-A is an American-built light high-wing single-seat sporting monoplane of the late 1920s.

Design and development

Willard A. Driggers of Washington, DC and Willow Grove, Pennsylvania designed and built the D1-A in 1929. It is a parasol high-wing monoplane with the aerofoil braced from the upper fuselage and lower fuselage. A fixed tailwheel undercarriage is fitted. The tailplane is set high on the rear fuselage and is braced. The rounded fin has a large rudder area. The 60 h.p. Lawrance L-4 engine is fitted within an elegant curved cowling with the cylinder heads protruding to allow air cooling. The D1-A has manufacturers number 1 and is registered N891H.  Driggers went on to design and build the two-seat Driggers D2-A in 1933.

Operational history

The builder and owner flew the D1-A from 1929 until 1936, when it was damaged in a ground loop. It was named Sunshine Girl III. The aircraft was stored until 1968 when an Experimental Aircraft Association group rebuilt it for static exhibition.  It is currently displayed at the EAA museum at Oshkosh Wisconsin.

Specifications

Notes

References

  Details of the Driggers aircraft Aerofiles.com
Ogden, Bob, Aviation Museums and Collections of North America, 2007, Air-Britain (Historians) Ltd, .

1920s United States sport aircraft
Parasol-wing aircraft
Single-engined tractor aircraft